MECD is the second album by Norwegian pop / experimental singer-songwriter Kaada. It was released in 2004, and it is the first album by Kaada that was not released under the Ipecac label, the second being Junkyard Nostalgias. It was released by Warner Music Group instead.

Track listing

Notes
 "That's Life O-Oh", "Convictions" and "Dammit, Planet Earth" were originally composed for the Swedish film Tur och Retur (Swedish for "Round Trip").

External links
 Official website

Kaada albums
2004 albums